This is a list of wars involving Japan.

List

See also

 Japan during World War I
 Japan during World War II
 List of Japanese battles

Reference

Japan
Wars
Wars
Wars